

Background
On 22 June 1942, the Albanian student trio of Branko Kadija, Jordan Misja,  and Perlat Rexhepi, who stayed in Misja's house at Firaj Street in Shkodër (at the time part of the fascist Italian protectorate of the Albanian Kingdom), were for several hours surrounded by Albanian (fascist) forces and police, numbering some 600 people. The three young friends were members of the Communist Party of Albania, which was established on 8 November 1941 and had begun with smaller detachments of 5-10 people which engaged in various acts of sabotage to the Italian forces, including antifascist propaganda in order to gain support of the masses. After an air bombardment, they rushed out of the house and managed to kill many of the quisling soldiers, but were shot down and instantly killed. The three were proclaimed People's Heroes of Albania for their act, and they are collectively known as the Three Heroes of Shkodër.

Jordan Misja was a painter. Kadija and Misja belonged to the Orthodox community of Shkodër, which at that time there were a few families, which all belonged to the same social level.

Legacy

The "Perlat Rexhepi" partisan battalion from Shkodër operated in the Gjakovë highlands in 1943, and assisted the conference of Albanian and Yugoslav communists in the same year.

Several schools, streets and other buildings have been named after the three individuals.

In 1946, the first middle school for art, the "Jordan Misja Artistic Lyceum", was opened in Tirana, with the branches of music, figurative arts and choreography.
Jordan Misja High School, in Shkodër
Prison 313, also known as "Jordan Misja Prison", in Tirana
Branko Kadija Street (Rruga Branko Kadija), in Shkodër
Perlat Rexhepi Street (Rruga Perlat Rexhepi), in Tirana
Perlat Rexhepi agricultural enterprise

See also
Perlat Rexhepi in Albanian Wikipedia
Branko Kadia in Albanian Wikipedia

References

Sources

Further reading

External links



20th-century Albanian people
Heroes of Albania
Albanian communists
1942 in Albania

Deaths by firearm in Albania
Trios
People from Shkodër
People from Vlorë
Albanian resistance members